Rajko Tavčar (born 21 July 1974) is a Slovenian footballer who played as a midfielder or left back.

He played for the Slovenia national football team and was a participant at the 2002 FIFA World Cup.

References

Living people
1974 births
Sportspeople from Kranj
Association football midfielders
Association football fullbacks
Slovenian footballers
2002 FIFA World Cup players
Slovenia international footballers
FC Augsburg players
SpVgg Greuther Fürth players
SV Wehen Wiesbaden players
1. FC Nürnberg players
SC Fortuna Köln players
SV Wacker Burghausen players
1. FSV Mainz 05 players
SpVgg Unterhaching players
Bundesliga players
Expatriate footballers in Germany
German people of Slovenian descent